Dan Marian Matei (born 25 June 1981) is a Romanian former footballer who played as a centre back. In his career, Matei played for teams such as Universitatea Cluj, Gloria Bistrița, FCM Târgu Mureș, UTA Arad or Sănătatea Cluj.

External links
 
 

1981 births
Living people
Sportspeople from Cluj-Napoca
Romanian footballers
Association football defenders
Liga I players
Liga II players
Liga III players
FC Unirea Urziceni players
FC Universitatea Cluj players
ACF Gloria Bistrița players
CSM Câmpia Turzii players
FC Internațional Curtea de Argeș players
ASA 2013 Târgu Mureș players
FC UTA Arad players